Sir Alexis Holyweek Sarei, CBE (25 March 1934 – 22 September 2014) was a Papua New Guinean politician from Bougainville. He governed North Solomons Province (Bougainville) as district commissioner from 1973 to 1975, as president of the secessionist Republic of the North Solomons that existed from 1975 to 1976, and as premier twice, from 1976 to 1980 and again from 1984 to 1987. Between premierships, he also served as Papua New Guinean High Commissioner to the United Kingdom.

References

1934 births
2014 deaths
High Commissioners of Papua New Guinea to the United Kingdom
Members of the Bougainville House of Representatives
Papua New Guinean politicians
Heads of state in Oceania
Papua New Guinean knights
People from the Autonomous Region of Bougainville